The R634 road is a regional road in Ireland. It travels from the N25 road outside Youghal, County Cork, north to the N72 in County Waterford, via Youghal town centre and the village of Tallow, County Waterford.

References

Regional roads in the Republic of Ireland
Roads in County Cork
Roads in County Waterford